Lahuli, Lahauli or Lahul Bhoti may be any of several closely-related Lahuli–Spiti languages (or "Western Innovative Tibetan"), of the Lahaul and Spiti district, in the state of Himachal Pradesh, India. These include:

 Bhoti Kinnauri also called Nyamkat, or the Nyam language
 Bunan, also known as Lahuli of Bunan, Gahri, Ghara, Punan, Erankad, or Keylong Boli
 Lahul Lohar
 Pattani also called Manchad or Chamba Lahuli
 Spiti Bhoti
 Tinani, also known as Tinan Lahuli
 Tukpa, also known as Nesang